Rudkowski (feminine: Rudkowska; plural: Rudkowscy) is a surname. Notable people with the surname include:

 Mateusz Rudkowski (c. 1809 — c. 1887), Ukrainian-Polish composer
 Wiesław Rudkowski (1946–2016), Polish boxer

Related surnames

See also
 

Polish-language surnames